China's busiest airports are a series of lists ranking the 100 busiest airports in Mainland China according to the number of total passengers, including statistics for total aircraft movements and total cargo movements, following the official register yearly since 2000. The data here presented are provided by the Civil Aviation Administration of China (CAAC) and these statistics do not include the results for the special administrative regions of Hong Kong and Macau, or the disputed region of Taiwan. Both Hong Kong and Macau have their own civil aviation regulators (the Civil Aviation Department and the Civil Aviation Authority respectively); Taiwan also has its own civil aviation regulator (the Aviation Safety Council).

The lists are presented in chronological order starting from the latest year. The number of total passengers is measured in persons and includes any passenger that arrives or departs from, or transits through, every airport in the country. The number of total aircraft movements is measured in airplane-times and includes the departures and arrivals of any kind of aircraft in schedule or charter conditions. The number of total cargo movements in metric tonnes and includes all the movements of cargo and mail that arrives or departs from the airport.

At a glance

2021 final statistics

 

The 100 busiest airports in China in 2021 ordered by total passenger traffic, according to CAAC statistics.

2020 final statistics

The 100 busiest airports in China in 2020 ordered by total passenger traffic, according to CAAC statistics.

2019 final statistics

The 100 busiest airports in China in 2019 ordered by total passenger traffic, according to CAAC statistics.

2018 final statistics

The 100 busiest airports in China in 2018 ordered by total passenger traffic, according to CAAC statistics.

2017 final statistics

The 100 busiest airports in China in 2017 ordered by total passenger traffic, according to the CAAC.

2016 final statistics

The 100 busiest airports in China in 2016 ordered by total passenger traffic, according to the CAAC report.

2015 final statistics

The 100 busiest airports in China in 2015 ordered by total passenger traffic, according to the CAAC report.

2014 final statistics

The 100 busiest airports in China in 2014 ordered by total passenger traffic, according to the CAAC report.

2013 final statistics

The 100 busiest airports in China in 2013 ordered by total passenger traffic, according to the CAAC report.

2012 final statistics

The 100 busiest airports in China in 2012 ordered by total passenger traffic, according to the CAAC report.

2011 final statistics

The 100 busiest airports in China in 2011 ordered by total passenger traffic, according to the CAAC report.

2010 final statistics

The 100 busiest airports in China in 2010 ordered by total passenger traffic, according to the CAAC report.

2009 final statistics

The 100 busiest airports in China in 2009 ordered by total passenger traffic, according to the CAAC report.

2008 final statistics

The 100 busiest airports in China in 2008 ordered by total passenger traffic, according to the CAAC report.

2007 final statistics

The 100 busiest airports in China in 2007 ordered by total passenger traffic, according to the CAAC report.

2006 final statistics

The 100 busiest airports in China in 2006 ordered by total passenger traffic, according to the CAAC report.

2005 final statistics

The 100 busiest airports in China in 2005 ordered by total passenger traffic, according to the CAAC report.

2004 final statistics
The 100 busiest airports in China in 2004 ordered by total passenger traffic, according to the CAAC report.

2003 final statistics
The 100 busiest airports in China in 2003 ordered by total passenger traffic, according to the CAAC report.

2002 final statistics

The 100 busiest airports in China in 2002 ordered by total passenger traffic, according to the CAAC report.

2001 final statistics
The 100 busiest airports in China in 2001 ordered by total passenger traffic, according to the CAAC report.

2000 final statistics
The 100 busiest airports in China in 2000 ordered by total passenger traffic, according to the CAAC report.

See also

References

 Busiest
China
Busiest